Kevin Girard Murray (born March 12, 1960) is a lawyer and a former American politician.  He was the first California Assemblyman to serve alongside his father, who is Willard H. Murray Jr.

Education
Murray attended California State University, Northridge, earning a BSBA.  Murray earned a MBA from Loyola Marymount University in 1983, and a JD from Loyola Law School in 1987.

Law career
Prior to his election to the assembly, Murray practiced law in the areas of entertainment, real estate, insurance, and dependency.  He also provided consulting and management services to artists in the entertainment industry.

California State Assembly
Murray was an assemblyman in the California State Assembly from 1994 to 1998. He represented the 47th district, which covers an area of Los Angeles.  Murray was a Democrat, and he served as Chair of the Transportation Committee.

California State Senate
Murray was a senator in the California State Senate, representing the 26th district based in Culver City, California. He was also chair of the Appropriations Committee, the Transportation Committee, the Democratic Caucus, and the California Legislative Black Caucus.  Murray also served on the California Film Commission.  He retired due to term limits in 2006.

In the early 2000s, Senator Murray was vigorous in his advocacy on behalf of creative workers in the entertainment industry. He convened hearings in 2001 and 2002 on contracting and accounting practices in the recording industry and sponsored two bills aimed to improve the legal standing of recording artists with respect to the duration of their contracts and their ability to conduct royalty audits of their record companies. These measures were strongly opposed by the RIAA; the contract oriented bill (SB 1246, which would have amended the CA Labor Code) failed to pass, but the audit bill (SB 1034) was passed. [citations forthcoming]

Premier Power Renewable Energy
On December 4, 2008, Premier Power Renewable Energy announced that Kevin Murray has been elected to Premier Power's board of directors.

References

External links
Join California Kevin Murray

Democratic Party members of the California State Assembly
Democratic Party California state senators
Loyola Marymount University alumni
Loyola Law School alumni
1960 births
Living people
21st-century American politicians
African-American state legislators in California
21st-century African-American politicians
20th-century African-American people